Portugal competed at the 1956 Summer Olympics in Melbourne, Australia and Stockholm, Sweden (equestrian events).

A total delegation of twelve competitors (five in Melbourne, seven in Stockholm) participated in two sports, however no medals were conquered by this nation.

Results by event

Equestrian
Men's Individual Dressage:
 António Pereira de Almeida — 12th (743 marks)

Men's Individual Eventing:
 Álvaro Sabbo — eliminated
 Fernando Marques Cavaleiro — 34th (−657,24 points)
 Joaquim Duarte Silva — 29th (−349,55 points)

Men's Team Eventing:
 Álvaro Sabbo, Fernando Marques Cavaleiro and Joaquim Duarte Silva — eliminated

Men's Individual Jumping:
 Henrique Alves Calado — 7th (16 marks)
 João Azevedo — eliminated
 Rodrigo da Silveira — eliminated

Men's Team Jumping:
 Henrique Alves Calado, João Azevedo and Rodrigo da Silveira — 11th - 20th

Sailing
Men's Dragon:
 Bernardo Mendes de Almeida (helm), Carlos Rogenmoser Lourenço and Serge Marquis — 13th (2002 points)

Men's Star:
 Duarte de Almeida Bello (helm) and José Bustorff Silva — 4th (3825 points)

Officials
 Fernando Pais (chief of mission)

References
Official Olympic Reports

Nations at the 1956 Summer Olympics
1956
1956 in Portuguese sport